Maria Goretti is a 2003 Italian television movie directed by Giulio Base and starring Martina Pinto in the title role. The film is based on real life events of Catholic virgin-martyr and Saint Maria Goretti.

Plot

Cast
 Martina Pinto as Maria Goretti
 Fabrizio Bucci as Alessandro Serenelli
 Massimo Bonetti as Luigi Goretti
 Luisa Ranieri as Assunta Goretti
 Flavio Insinna as Father Basilio Morganti
 Claudia Koll as Countess Mazzoleni
 Marco Messeri as Don Temistocle Signori
 Luca Biagini as Count Atilio Mazzoleni
 Manrico Gammarota as Giovanni Serenelli
 Anna Rita Del Piano as Teresa Cimarelli 
 Giulio Base as Doctor Bartoli

References

External links

2003 television films
2003 films
Italian television films
2003 biographical drama films
Films set in Italy
Italian biographical drama films
Films about religion
Films directed by Giulio Base
Films scored by Ennio Morricone
Cultural depictions of Italian women
2000s Italian films